Pilbarascutigera is a monotypic genus of centipedes in the family Scutigeridae. It is endemic to Australia, with the type locality being Broome in the Kimberley region of far north Western Australia. It was described by Gregory Edgecombe and Lauren Barrow in 2007. Its sole species is Pilbarascutigera incola (Verhoeff, 1925).

References

 

 
 Scutigeridae
Centipede genera
Monotypic arthropod genera
Centipedes of Australia
Animals described in 2007
Taxa named by Gregory Edgecombe